John Ernst Freund (August 6, 1921 – August 14, 2004) was a prominent author of university level textbooks on statistics and a mathematics professor at Arizona State University. Born in Berlin, Germany, he emigrated to Mandatory Palestine in the 1930s. He studied at the University of London and at the University of California at Los Angeles, from which he received his bachelor's degree. He did graduate work at Columbia University and the University of Pittsburgh, from which he received his doctorate in 1952.

In 1960 he was elected as a Fellow of the American Statistical Association.

Selected publications

References

Further reading

1921 births
2004 deaths
American statisticians
German emigrants to Mandatory Palestine

 University of California, Los Angeles alumni
 University of Pittsburgh alumni
Arizona State University faculty
Fellows of the American Statistical Association